Nino Pekarić (Serbian Cyrillic: Нино Пекарић; born 16 August 1982) is a former Serbian professional footballer who played as a defender.

Honours
Vojvodina
 Serbian Cup (1): 2013–14

External links
 

Association football defenders
Cypriot First Division players
Expatriate footballers in Cyprus
Expatriate footballers in Romania
FC Dinamo București players
FK Hajduk Kula players
FK Novi Pazar players
RFK Novi Sad 1921 players
FK Radnički Obrenovac players
FK Vojvodina players
Liga I players
Nea Salamis Famagusta FC players
Red Star Belgrade footballers
Serbia and Montenegro under-21 international footballers
Serbian expatriate footballers
Serbian expatriate sportspeople in Cyprus
Serbian expatriate sportspeople in Romania
Serbian footballers
Serbian SuperLiga players
Footballers from Novi Sad
1982 births
Living people